

I

J

K

L

M

N

O

P

Q

See also 

 List of electronic music record labels
 List of independent UK record labels
List of Bangladeshi record labels

External links 
45cat.com - record labels listed by country
discogs.com - searchable by label